The year 2010 is the 10th year in the history of Deep, a mixed martial arts promotion based in Japan. In 2010 Deep held 18 events beginning with, Deep: 45 Impact.

Title fights

Events list

Deep: 45 Impact

Deep: 45 Impact was an event held on January 24, 2010 at Zepp Osaka in Osaka.

Results

Deep: 46 Impact

Deep: 46 Impact was an event held on February 28, 2010 at Korakuen Hall in Tokyo.

Results

Deep: clubDeep Tokyo in Shinjuku

Deep: clubDeep Tokyo in Shinjuku was an event held on March 28, 2010 at The Pink Big Pig in Tokyo.

Results

Deep: Kobudo Fight 9

Deep: Kobudo Fight 9 was an event held on April 11, 2010 at Asunal Kanayama Hall in Nagoya.

Results

Deep: 47 Impact

Deep: 47 Impact was an event held on April 17, 2010 at Korakuen Hall in Tokyo.

Results

Deep: clubDeep Toyama: Barbarian Festival 8

Deep: clubDeep Toyama: Barbarian Festival 8 was an event held on May 16, 2010 at Toyama Event Plaza in Toyama.

Results

Deep: clubDeep Tokyo in Shinkiba 1st Ring

Deep: clubDeep Tokyo in Shinkiba 1st Ring was an event held on May 23, 2010 at Shinkiba 1st Ring in Tokyo.

Results

Deep: Cage Impact 2010 in Osaka

Deep: Cage Impact 2010 in Osaka was an event held on June 6, 2010 at Zepp Osaka in Osaka.

Results

Deep: 48 Impact

Deep: 48 Impact was an event held on July 3, 2010 at Differ Ariake in Tokyo.

Results

Deep: Cage Impact in Nagoya

Deep: Cage Impact in Nagoya was an event held on July 11, 2010 at Zepp Nagoya in Nagoya.

Results

Deep: clubDeep Hachioji 2

Deep: clubDeep Hachioji 2 was an event held on August 1, 2010 at Keio Plaza Hotel in Tokyo.

Results

Deep: 49 Impact

Deep: 49 Impact was an event held on August 27, 2010 at Korakuen Hall in Tokyo.

Results

Deep: clubDeep Nagoya: Kobudo Fight

Deep: clubDeep Nagoya: Kobudo Fight was an event held on September 5, 2010 at Asunal Kanayama Hall in Nagoya.

Results

Deep: Cage Impact 2010 in Hamamatsu

Deep: Cage Impact 2010 in Hamamatsu was an event held on September 19, 2010 at Act City in Hamamatsu.

Results

Deep: 50 Impact

Deep: 50 Impact was an event held on October 24, 2010 at JCB Hall in Tokyo.

Results

Deep: Future King Tournament 2010

Deep: Future King Tournament 2010 was an event held on December 11, 2010 at Differ Ariake in Tokyo.

Results

Deep: 51 Impact

Deep: 51 Impact was an event held on December 11, 2010 at Differ Ariake in Tokyo.

Results

Deep: Kobudo Fight Future Challenge 9

Deep: Kobudo Fight Future Challenge 9 was an event held on December 19, 2010 at Kobudo Martial Arts Communication Space, Tiger Hall in Nagoya.

Results

See also 
 List of Deep champions
 List of Deep events

References

Deep (mixed martial arts) events
2010 in mixed martial arts